The 1908 Michigan gubernatorial election was held on November 3, 1908. Incumbent Republican Fred M. Warner defeated Democratic candidate Lawton T. Hemans with 48.39% of the vote.

General election

Candidates
Major party candidates
Fred M. Warner, Republican
Lawton T. Hemans, Democratic
Other candidates
John W. Gray, Prohibition
Alexander M. Stirton, Socialist
Archie McInnis, Socialist Labor
Alva W. Nichols, Independence

Results

References

1908
Michigan
Gubernatorial
November 1908 events